Philippe-François de Rastel de Rocheblave also, known as, Philippe de Rocheblave and the Chevalier de Rocheblave (March 23, 1727 – April 3, 1802), was a soldier and businessman in the Illinois Country, of Upper Louisiana, and later, a political figure in Lower Canada. He was sometimes referred to as the Chevalier de Rocheblave.

Early life
Philippe-François de Rastel de Rocheblave was born in Savournon, Hautes-Alpes, France.

Illinois Country, Upper Louisiana Territory
Philippe de Rocheblave served in the French Army. Rocheblave led French troops in New France, during the Seven Years' War also, known as, the French and Indian War in North America, serving as a lieutenant at Fort de Chartres in the Illinois Country. He later established a business at Kaskaskia. After the British took control of Kaskaskia, he became the commandant of Fort Sainte-Geneviève, in the Illinois Country for New Spain. In 1774, Rocheblave took command of Kaskaskia, for the British.

American Revolutionary War
In 1778, during the American Revolutionary War, Colonel George Rogers Clark, commander of the Illinois Regiment, Virginia State Forces, captured Kaskaskia for the Americans and took Philippe de Rocheblave prisoner. Rocheblave was sent to Virginia, where he eluded parole and fled to the British forces in New York City.

Post-War years and death

According to Robert MacIntosh's 2006 book "Earliest Toronto", after the American Revolutionary War ended, Rocheblave first settled in Upper Canada, where Lord Dorchester, the Governor-General approved a grant of 1000 acres on the banks of the Humber River.  However, the grant stalled when it fell to John Graves Simcoe, the Lieutenant Governor of Upper Canada, and his appointees, to process it, and specify the actual acres that should have been his.
 
Philippe de Rocheblave then brought his family to Montreal; they later settled at Varennes in 1789. He became involved in the fur trade in the Detroit region. In 1796, Rocheblave was elected to the Legislative Assembly of Lower Canada for Surrey and was re-elected in 1796 and 1800, serving until his death in 1802.  The sons of Rocheblave, Noël and Pierre, also, became members of the legislative assembly.  Pierre de Rastel de Rocheblave also, became a member of the Lower Canada Legislative Council.  Philippe de Rocheblave died on April 3, 1802, in Quebec City, Lower Canada.

References

External links
 
Famille de Rastel de Rocheblave

1727 births
1802 deaths
American Revolutionary War prisoners of war held by the United States
British officials in the American Revolution
Illinois in the American Revolution
French people of the French and Indian War
French Canadians in the American Revolution
Members of the Legislative Assembly of Lower Canada
People from Hautes-Alpes